The Ringgold Commercial Historic District, in Ringgold, Georgia, is a historic district which was listed on the National Register of Historic Places in 1992.

It includes seven contributing buildings and three non-contributing ones, on Nashville St. between Tennessee and Depot Streets.  The oldest one was built around 1860.

References

National Register of Historic Places in Catoosa County, Georgia
Historic districts on the National Register of Historic Places in Georgia (U.S. state)
Greek Revival architecture in Georgia (U.S. state)
Buildings and structures completed in 1860